Lesley Allison Thompson-Willie (born September 20, 1959) is a Canadian rowing coxswain and Olympic champion.  Between 1984 and 2016, she has competed at eight Olympic Games, a record for a rower, winning medals in five of them including gold in coxed eight at the 1992 Summer Olympics in Barcelona.

Career
At the 1984 Summer Olympics in Los Angeles Thompson competed in the Women's Coxed Four event; the Canadian team won a silver medal behind gold winner Romania. At the 1988 Summer Olympics in Seoul the Canadian team qualified for the B final in coxed four, and placed 7th. At the 1991 World Championships in Austria she won a gold medal in coxed eight with the Canadian team. Next year, at the 1992 Summer Olympics in Barcelona she competed in coxed eight, winning a gold medal for Canada. In 1996 in Atlanta she won a silver medal in coxed eight. At the 1998 World Championships in France she placed second in coxed eight. At the 2000 Summer Olympics in Sydney she won a bronze medal in coxed eight. At the 2008 Summer Olympics in Beijing, she coxed the Canadian eight boat that finished in fourth. When the Canadian eights won silver at the 2012 London Olympics she became the first Canadian to win medals at five different Olympic Games.

A former track athlete, she also competed in gymnastics until 1983. She lives in London and St. Catharines and is affiliated with the London RC Club.  She was elected to the Canadian Olympic Hall of Fame in 1994.

She initially retired after the 2000 Sydney Olympics, missing the 2004 Summer Olympics in Athens. Her appearance at the 2008 Olympics, when her team lost out on a medal by 0.79 seconds, began back in 2005 when she made a joke to rowing coach Al Morrow about going to Beijing. When he replied, "Really?", she began training.

Aged 56, Thompson-Willie coxed the women's eight for Canada at the 2016 Olympic Games in Rio de Janeiro.  Her crew would go on to finish 5th.  As of 2019 she continues to train with the national team, and has been named as coxswain of the Canadian men's eight for the World Rowing Cup.

She is one of only nine athletes who have competed at eight Olympic Games with her record standing alone among rowers.

Outside rowing
Thompson-Willie is a graduate of the University of Western Ontario. She was a teacher-librarian and physical education teacher at South Secondary School in London, Ontario but retired in 2018. She married Dr. Paul Willie in 2000, but still competed as Lesley Thompson at the 2000 Sydney Olympics. Her husband is a professor of accounting, finance, and hotel management at Niagara College.

See also
 List of athletes with the most appearances at Olympic Games

References

External links

1959 births
Living people
Olympic rowers of Canada
Olympic gold medalists for Canada
Olympic silver medalists for Canada
Olympic bronze medalists for Canada
Rowers at the 1984 Summer Olympics
Rowers at the 1988 Summer Olympics
Rowers at the 1992 Summer Olympics
Rowers at the 1996 Summer Olympics
Rowers at the 2000 Summer Olympics
Rowers at the 2008 Summer Olympics
Rowers at the 2012 Summer Olympics
Rowers at the 2016 Summer Olympics
Olympic medalists in rowing
Canadian female rowers
University of Western Ontario alumni
Medalists at the 1984 Summer Olympics
Medalists at the 1992 Summer Olympics
Medalists at the 1996 Summer Olympics
Medalists at the 2000 Summer Olympics
Medalists at the 2012 Summer Olympics
Canadian schoolteachers
Rowers from London, Ontario
World Rowing Championships medalists for Canada
Commonwealth Games gold medallists for Canada
Commonwealth Games medallists in rowing
Rowers at the 1986 Commonwealth Games
Medallists at the 1986 Commonwealth Games